Richard Farrer Herschell, 2nd Baron Herschell  (22 May 1878 – 14 October 1929), was a British Liberal politician.

Background and early life
Herschell was the only son of the Lord Chancellor, Farrer Herschell, 1st Baron Herschell, and his wife Agnes Adela (née Kindersley), and succeeded in the barony in 1899.

Political career
He was private secretary to the Lord-Lieutenant of Ireland the Earl of Aberdeen from 1905 to 1907 and served in the Liberal administrations of Sir Henry Campbell-Bannerman and later H. H. Asquith as a Lord-in-waiting to King Edward VII, 1907-10 (government whip in the House of Lords) from 1907 to 1915. And also Lord-in-Waiting to George V 1910–19. He was awarded Order of the Dannebrog from Denmark, and Legion of Honour.

Military career
In the First World War he served in the Royal Navy's code breaking section "Room 40" as a Commander RNVR.

Family
Lord Herschell married Annie Vera Violet, daughter of Sir Arthur Thomas Bennett Nicolson, 10th Baronet, in 1919. The wedding took place at the Nicolson property of Brough Lodge on Fetlar, Shetland. He died in October 1929, aged 51, and was succeeded in the barony by his son Rognvald. Lady Herschell died in 1961.

Honours
In 1907, Herschell was appointed to the Royal Victorian Order as a Member (MVO). In 1917, he was promoted within the same Order to be a Knight Commander (KCVO). In the 1919 New Year Honours, he was promoted again to be a Knight Grand Cross (GCVO).

Arms

References

Cited reference

Herschell, Richard Herschell, 2nd Baron
Herschell, Richard Herschell, 2nd Baron
British people of Polish-Jewish descent
Herschell, Richard Herschell, 2nd Baron
Herschell, Richard Herschell, 2nd Baron
Herschell, Richard Herschell, 2nd Baron
Herschell, Richard Herschell, 2nd Baron
Richard